Michael Benson may refer to:

 Michael Benson (poet) (1795–1871), English printer and poet
 Michael Benson (filmmaker) (born 1962), American writer, filmmaker, photographer and exhibitions producer
 Michael T. Benson (born 1965), American university president
 Mike Benson (Canadian football) (born 1987), Canadian football player
 Mike Benson (screenwriter), American television writer and comics writer
 Mike Benson (politician) (born 1955), Minnesota politician